Brezovica is a city district and a settlement part of Zagreb, Croatia, located in the southwestern part of the city. The district has a total population of 12,030 inhabitants, while the settlement itself has a population of 594 (as of 2011).

It is one of the more rural districts in Zagreb. The A1 highway passes through Brezovica, although it has no exits there.

Of note is Dvorac Brezovica, an eighteenth-century chateau now owned by the Zagreb Archdiocese. Dvorac Brezovica (castle) has been abandoned for several years and the building and its surroundings have fallen into disrepair.

List of neighborhoods in Brezovica 

 Brebernica
 Demerje
 Donji Dragonožec
 Goli Breg
 Gornji Dragonožec
 Grančari
 Havidić Selo
 Horvati
 Hudi Bitek
 Lipnica
 Kupinečki Kraljevec
 Odranski Obrež
 Strmec
 Donji Trpuci
 Gornji Trpuci
 Starjak
 Zadvorsko

References

Districts of Zagreb
Populated places in the City of Zagreb